Ernest Stanley Williamson (26 May 1880 – 16 December 1967) was an Australian rules footballer who played with St Kilda in the Victorian Football League (VFL).

Notes

External links 

1880 births
1967 deaths
Australian rules footballers from Victoria (Australia)
St Kilda Football Club players
Australian military personnel of World War I
Military personnel from Victoria (Australia)